Yohannah Ahmed Audu is an Anglican bishop in Nigeria: a former Archdeacon he is the current Bishop of Damaturu, one of ten dioceses within the Anglican Province of Jos, itself one of 14 provinces within the Church of Nigeria.

Notes

Living people
Anglican bishops of Damaturu
21st-century Anglican bishops in Nigeria
Year of birth missing (living people)
Church of Nigeria archdeacons